The Northwestern Wildcats baseball team is the varsity intercollegiate athletic team of the Northwestern University in Evanston, Illinois, United States. The team competes in the National Collegiate Athletic Association's Division I and are members of the Big Ten Conference.

The Wildcats have been to 1 NCAA tournament in 1957. In 2017, the Wildcats made it to the Big Ten Conference Baseball Tournament Championship.

Stadiums

Rocky and Berenice Miller Park

Rocky and Berenice Miller Park is a baseball stadium in Evanston, Illinois. It is the home stadium of the Northwestern University Wildcats college baseball team since 1943. The stadium is named after J. Roscoe Miller, an Northwestern President from 1949 to 1970 and his wife. In 2013, Miller's daughter, Roxy and her husband Richard Pepper, donated the money to renovate the stadium.

Head coaches

NCAA tournament

Player awards

First-team All-Americans
The following is a listing of the selections listed in the 2018 Northwestern Baseball Media Guide on nusports.com.

1979
Bill Dierberger – American Baseball Coaches Association (ABCA)
1985
Joe Girardi (C) – ABCA
1986
Grady Hall – ABCA

1993
Mark Loretta (SS) – ABCA
2000
Jeremy Kurella (SS) – ABCA

Big Ten award winners

Player of the Year Award
Mark Loretta (1993)
Pitcher of the Year
Chad Schroeder (1995)
Dan Brauer (2006)

Freshman of the Year Award
Keith Batchelder (1997)
Eric Jokisch (2008)

References

External links